François Bay (or Fransway Bay) is natural bay on the island of Newfoundland in the province of Newfoundland and Labrador, Canada. It is near Chaleur Bay.  The settlement of Francois is located on the bay.

References

Bays of Newfoundland and Labrador